Sergio Lozano may refer to:

 Sergio Lozano Martínez (born 1988), Spanish futsal player
 Sergio Lozano (boxer) (born 1952), Mexican boxer
 Sergio Lozano (footballer) (born 1999), Spanish footballer